Mueang Buriram is the capital district (amphoe mueang) of Buriram province, northeastern Thailand.

Geography
Neighboring districts are (from the south clockwise): Prakhon Chai, Nang Rong, Chamni, Lam Plai Mat, Khu Mueang, Ban Dan, Huai Rat, and Krasang of Buriram Province.

Motto
The Mueang Buriram District's motto is "stone from Kradong Volcano erupted, bird filed park, Rama I's founder of the city, Suphat Thara Bophit Buddha image and excellent tradition."

Administration
The district is divided into 19 sub-districts (tambons), which are further subdivided into 320 villages (mubans). The town (thesaban mueang) Buriram covers the whole tambon Nai Mueang. There are also 18 tambon administrative organizations (TAO).

Missing numbers are tambons which now form the districts Ban Dan and Huai Rat.

Mueang Buriram